Vidhi Madhi Ultaa is a 2018 Indian Tamil-language fantasy comedy film written and directed by Vijai Balaji. Starring Rameez Raja and Janani Iyer, the film has Daniel Balaji and Karunakaran in pivotal roles. The film began production during January 2016 and was released on 5 January 2018 to mixed reviews from critics.

Cast

 Rameez Raja as Aditya
 Janani Iyer as Divya
 Daniel Balaji as Danie
 Karunakaran as Rajamani
 Sendrayan as Ramesh
 G. Gnanasambandam as Aditya's father
 Chitra Lakshmanan as Divya's father 
 Lingesh Logesh Twins as Comic Villains 
 Naan Saravanan as Medical Shop Owner

Soori only voice

Production
In January 2016, Rameez Raja announced he would produce and star in a film to be directed by Vijay Balaji. Titled Ultaa, the film was planned before the release of Rameez Raja's debut Darling 2 (2016), and Janani Iyer was signed on to play the leading female role. Touted to be a "dark comedy", production began in early 2016 in Chennai. The film was also shot across Puducherry and Kerala, and was completed in late 2016 but was delayed for a year before its release. The title was changed to Vidhi Madhi Ulta during mid-2016.

Soundtrack

The film's music was composed by Ashwin Vinayagamoorthy, while the audio rights of the film was acquired by Sony Music India. The album released on 26 October 2017 and featured five songs.

Release
The film opened on 5 January 2018 to mixed reviews, with the critic from The Times of India giving the film a negative review and stating "the screenplay goes haywire after some time, making things quite predictable and clichéd. ". The critic further added that "though the film starts in a lackadaisical manner, there is a point when it makes viewers believe that the plot could have worked with some engaging moments". A critic from the New Indian Express claimed it had "half-baked humour that tries one’s patience".

References

External links
 

2018 films
2010s Tamil-language films
Films set in Chennai
Films shot in Chennai
Indian black comedy films
Indian comedy thriller films
2018 directorial debut films
2018 comedy films